Stisseria was a genus of plants in the Apocynaceae, first described as a genus in 1759, now considered a synonym of Stapelia.

Species accepted

formerly included
moved to other genera (Duvalia, Gonostemon, Hoodia, Orbea, Quaqua, Tridentea)

References

Asclepiadoideae
Apocynaceae genera